The family Munnopsidae is a family of asellote isopoda which is one of the most speciose and frequently collected of the known isopod families. As currently structured it consists of nine subfamilies, 42 genera and about 320 species. The Munnopsidae is frequently the most abundant and diverse isopod family in benthic deep−sea communities and also has a wide distribution in cold waters.

Genera within the family Munnopsidae
The following genera are listed for the Munnopsidae:

Acanthocopinae
 Acanthocope Beddard, 1885

Bathyopsurinae
 Bathyopsurus Nordenstam, 1955
 Paropsurus Wolff, 1962

Betamorphinae
 Amuletta Wilson & Thistle, 1985
 Betamorpha Hessler & Thistle, 1975

Eurycopinae
 Baeonectes Wilson, 1982
 Belonectes Wilson & Hessler, 1981
 Disconectes Wilson & Hessler, 1981
 Dubinectes Malyutina & Brandt, 2006
 Eurycope G.O. Sars, 1864
 Gurjanopsis Malyutina & Brandt, 2007
 Microcope Malyutina, 2008
 Tytthocope Wilson & Hessler, 1981

Ilyarachnae
 Aspidarachna G.O. Sars, 1897
 Bathybadistes Hessler & Thistle, 1975
 Echinozone G.O. Sars, 1897
 Epikopais Merrin, 2009
 Ilyarachna G.O. Sars, 1869
 Notopais Hodgson, 1910
 Nyctobadistes Merrin, 2011
 Pseudarachna G.O. Sars, 1897

Lipomerinae
 Coperonus Wilson, 1989
 Hapsidohedra Wilson, 1989
 Lionectes Wilson, 1989
 Lipomera Tattersall, 1905
 Mimocopelates Wilson, 1989
 Munneurycope Stephensen, 1912
 Munnicope Menzies & George, 1972

Munnopsinae
 Acanthamunnopsis Schultz, 1978
 Munnopsis M. Sars, 1861
 Munnopsoides Tattersall, 1905
 Paramunnopsis Hansen, 1916
 Pseudomunnopsis Hansen, 1916
 Munnopsurus Richardson, 1912

Storthyngurinae
 Microprotus Richardson, 1909
 Rectisura Malyutina, 2003
 Storthyngura Vanhöffen, 1914
 Storthyngurella Malyutina, 1999
 Sursumura Malyutina, 2003
 Vanhoeffenura Malyutina, 2004

Syneurycopinae
 Bellibos Haugsness & Hessler, 1979
 Syneurycope Hansen, 1916

References

Asellota
Isopoda
Taxa named by Wilhelm Lilljeborg
Crustacean families